András Ozsvár (born 19 February 1957 in Csongrád) is a Hungarian former judoka who competed in the 1980 Summer Olympics.

References

 

1957 births
Living people
Hungarian male judoka
Olympic judoka of Hungary
Judoka at the 1980 Summer Olympics
Olympic bronze medalists for Hungary
Olympic medalists in judo
Medalists at the 1980 Summer Olympics
20th-century Hungarian people